The following lists events from the year 2014 in Argentina.

Incumbents
 President: Cristina Fernández de Kirchner
 Vice president: Amado Boudou

Governors
Governor of Buenos Aires Province: Daniel Scioli 
Governor of Catamarca Province: Lucía Corpacci 
Governor of Chaco Province: Juan Carlos Bacileff Ivanoff 
Governor of Chubut Province: Martín Buzzi 
Governor of Córdoba: José Manuel De la Sota 
Governor of Corrientes Province: Ricardo Colombi 
Governor of Entre Ríos Province: Sergio Urribarri 
Governor of Formosa Province: Gildo Insfrán
Governor of Jujuy Province: Eduardo Fellner 
Governor of La Pampa Province: Óscar Jorge 
Governor of La Rioja Province: Luis Beder Herrera 
Governor of Mendoza Province: Francisco Pérez 
Governor of Misiones Province: Maurice Closs 
Governor of Neuquén Province: Jorge Sapag 
Governor of Río Negro Province: Alberto Weretilneck 
Governor of Salta Province: Juan Manuel Urtubey 
Governor of San Juan Province: José Luis Gioja 
Governor of San Luis Province: Claudio Poggi 
Governor of Santa Cruz Province: Daniel Peralta 
Governor of Santa Fe Province: Antonio Bonfatti 
Governor of Santiago del Estero: Claudia Ledesma Abdala
Governor of Tierra del Fuego: Fabiana Ríos 
Governor of Tucumán: José Alperovich

Vice Governors
Vice Governor of Buenos Aires Province: Gabriel Mariotto
Vice Governor of Catamarca Province: Dalmacio Mera 
Vice Governor of Chaco Province: vacant 
Vice Governor of Corrientes Province: Gustavo Canteros
Vice Governor of Entre Rios Province: José Orlando Cáceres
Vice Governor of Formosa Province: Floro Bogado 
Vice Governor of Jujuy Province: Guillermo Jenefes 
Vice Governor of La Pampa Province: Norma Durango 
Vice Governor of La Rioja Province: Sergio Casas 
Vice Governor of Misiones Province: Hugo Passalacqua 
Vice Governor of Neuquén Province: Ana Pechen 
Vice Governor of Rio Negro Province: Carlos Peralta 
Vice Governor of Salta Province: Andrés Zottos 
Vice Governor of San Juan Province: Sergio Uñac 
Vice Governor of San Luis Province: Jorge Raúl Díaz
Vice Governor of Santa Cruz: Fernando Cotillo
Vice Governor of Santa Fe Province: Jorge Henn
Vice Governor of Santiago del Estero: José Emilio Neder
Vice Governor of Tierra del Fuego: Roberto Crocianelli

Events

January
 January 24 - Restrictions enacted two years earlier on retail purchases of U.S. dollars were eased following a 15% drop in the Argentine peso days earlier.

February
 February 8 - A truck and a bus collide in the Argentine province of Mendoza, killing at least 17 people and injuring more than 10 others.
 February 17 - The Vatican head of state, Pope Francis, renews his Argentine passport, reportedly asking not to enjoy any privilege.

March
 March 17 - President Cristina Fernández de Kirchner visited Pope Francis at the Vatican; it was their third meeting.
 March 26 - Two new terminals at Buenos Aires' Jorge Newbery Airfield, the nation's busiest airport, were inaugurated, effectively doubling the airport's passenger capacity.

April
 April 10 - Massive general strike led by Dissident CGT heads Hugo Moyano and Luis Barrionuevo, and Dissident CTA head Pablo Micheli.
 April 22 - Broad Front UNEN, a center-left political coalition, was established following a convention in Buenos Aires' Broadway Theater.

May
 May 1 - Siam Di Tella's manufacturing plant in the Buenos Aires suburb of Piñeiro, once the largest appliance factory in South America, was reopened by local household electronics maker Newsan after 28 years.
 May 7 - Singer/songwriter Teresa Parodi was appointed the nation's first Minister of Culture following the president's decision to promote the Culture Secretariat to a cabinet-level ministry.
 May 16 - Announcement made of a new species of Titanosaur discovered in Patagonia, the largest land animal found to date
 May 29 - An agreement was reached with the Paris Club of creditor nations (the last remaining Argentine debt still in default besides bonds held by holdouts) on debt repayment totaling US$9 billion including penalties and interest.

June
 June 27 - Vice President Amado Boudou was indicted on passive bribery and influence peddling charges; Boudou appealed the indictment on July 10, alleging malicious prosecution.

July
 July 13 - Germany defeated Argentina by 1–0 in the 2014 FIFA World Cup Final.
 July 12 - Russian President Vladimir Putin and Chinese General Secretary Xi Jinping made official state visits to Argentina, during which a number of significant cultural and commercial agreements were signed.
 July 30 - Payments to bondholders with US$13 billion in New York-issued Argentine government bonds were stopped by District Court Judge Thomas Griesa at the behest of holdouts led by Paul Singer of Cayman Islands-based vulture fund NML Capital Limited; Argentine bonds issued under Buenos Aires and European Law were not affected.

August
 August 5 - Estela Barnes de Carlotto, President of the Association of Grandmothers of the Plaza de Mayo, announced that her long-lost grandson Guido (illegally placed for adoption at birth by his parents' military abductors during the Dirty War) had been discovered after he came forward for a DNA test.
 August 30 - ARSAT-1, the first geostationary satellite to be fully produced domestically, was unveiled, making Argentina only of only eight countries in the world to have done so.

Deaths
 January 2: Horacio Fargosi, 87, President of the Buenos Aires Stock Exchange 
 January 5: Eugenia de Chikoff, 94, etiquette writer 
 January 14: Juan Gelman, 83, poet
 January 25: Emanuel Saldaño, 28, cyclist
 January 28: Jorge Obeid, 66, Senator from Santa Fe Province
 February 20: Jorge Polaco, 67, film maker
 March 9: Carlos Moreno, 75, actor
 March 14: Jorge Ibáñez, 44, fashion designer
 April 11: Alfredo Alcón, 84, actor
 April 12: Carlos Peralta, 50, Vice Governor of Río Negro Province
 April 13: Ernesto Laclau, 78, political scientist
 April 15: Eliseo Verón, 78, sociologist
 April 24: Ricardo Bauleo, 67, actor 
 April 29: Norma Pons, 71, actress
 May 5: Eduardo Mac Entyre, 85, painter
 May 10: Carmen Argibay, 74, Argentine Supreme Court Justice
 May 10: Miguel Brascó, 87, food and wine critic 
 May 10: Andrés Carrasco, 67, discovered adverse effects of glyphosate (Monsanto Roundup) 
 June 3: Virginia Luque, 86, Tango singer
 June 9: Danilo Baroni, 92, former Governor of Chaco Province
 June 30: Alejandra Da Passano, 66, actress 
 July 6: Rogelio Polesello, 75, sculptor
 July 6: Ernesto Ueltschi, 92, former Governor of Mendoza Province
 July 7: Alfredo Di Stéfano, 88, football forward
 July 9: Alberto Cassano, 79, nuclear engineer
 July 28: Iris Scaccheri, 64, choreographer
 July 30: Julio Grondona, 82, President of the Argentine Football Association
 July 31: Jorge Jacobson, 78, journalist 
 August 7: Víctor Fayad, 59, Mayor of Mendoza
 August 9: Leonardo Moledo, 67, mathematician and writer
 August 12: Abel Laudonio, 75, boxer 
 August 14: Mariana Briski, 48, actress
 August 16: Pascual Mastellone, 84, Chairman of La Serenísima
 August 20: Eduardo Moliné O'Connor, 76, former Supreme Court Justice
 September 4: Gustavo Cerati, 55, musician
 September 17: China Zorrilla, 92, actress
 September 21: Cecilia Cenci, 72, actress
 November 17: Omar Chabán, 62, nightclub owner
 December 21: Horacio Ferrer, 81, Uruguay-born poet and composer

See also
List of Argentine films of 2014

References

External links

 
Years of the 21st century in Argentina
2010s in Argentina
Argentina
Argentina